Lights Out is a French thriller film directed by Fabrice Gobert and starring Jules Pelissier, Ana Girardot, Arthur Mazet, Laurent Delbecque, Serge Riaboukine and Laurent Capelluto.

Release 
The film was entered into the Un Certain Regard section of the 2010 Cannes Film Festival.

Reception 
Lee Marshall of Screen Daily wrote, "This genre-bending high-school thriller-drama about three students who go missing at a French lycee opens like a teen B-movie, but soon moves into more intriguing territory."  Jordan Mintzer of Variety called it "a deftly realized teen thriller" that is too similar to Elephant.

Cast 
 Jules Pelissier as Jérémie Legrand
 Ana Girardot as Alice Cartier
 Arthur Mazet as Jean-Baptiste Rabier
 Laurent Delbecque as Simon Werner
 Yan Tassin as Frédéric 
 Esteban Carvajal Alegria as Luc
 Audrey Bastien as Clara
 Laurent Capelluto as Yves
 Serge Riaboukine as Rabier's father

Soundtrack 

The soundtrack was written and performed by the US noise rock band Sonic Youth. It was released as part of the Sonic Youth Recordings series, titled as SYR9: Simon Werner a Disparu. It is notable for being the last release of new music from the band prior to their indefinite hiatus which was announced in 2012.

Track listing

References

External links 

2010 films
2010s French-language films
French thriller films
Films shot in France
French teen films
2010 thriller films
Films shot in Paris
2010 directorial debut films
2010s French films